Blue Ball is an unincorporated community in Scott and Yell counties, in the U.S. state of Arkansas.

History
Blue Ball was founded in 1873, and according to tradition was named from the fancied resemblance of a nearby mountain to a blue ball.  A variant name is "Blueball". A post office called Blue Ball was established in 1873, and remained in operation until 1955.

Blue Ball is the nearest settlement to Powder Magazine, a ruined Civilian Conservation Corps structure. The Powder Magazine was listed on the National Register of Historic Places in 1993.

References

Unincorporated communities in Arkansas
Unincorporated communities in Scott County, Arkansas
Unincorporated communities in Yell County, Arkansas